"Jeena Jeena" is a romantic Hindi song from the 2015 Bollywood film Badlapur. Composed by Sachin–Jigar, the song is sung by popular Bollywood singer from Pakistan, Atif Aslam , with lyrics penned by Dinesh Vijan and Priya Saraiya. The music video of the track features actors Varun Dhawan, Yami Gautam and Atif Aslam. Jeena Jeena is one of the biggest hits of 2015.

Music video 
The official music was released on 18 January 2015 by Eros Music on YouTube. It features Varun Dhawan, Yami Gautam and Atif Aslam.

Release 
The song was released on 15 January 2015, becoming a chart buster. It soon became one of the most successful Bollywood songs of 2015 and by Atif Aslam as well. It was his first Bollywood song since August 2014. The audio song was released on YouTube on 14 January 2015. The song broke records by remaining at the top spot on iTunes Indian Charts for 28 times, 99 times in top 10 and Radio Mirchi charts for 14 weeks consecutively.

Chart performance

Year-end charts

Track listing and formats
Digital single
 "Jeena Jeena" – 3:50

Original Motion Picture Soundtrack
 "Jeena Jeena" – 3:49
 "Jeena Jeena (Remix Version)" – 3:39

References

Hindi film songs
Songs written for films
2015 songs
Atif Aslam songs